Schaap is a Dutch metonymic surname meaning "sheep". Notable people with the surname include:

Annet Schaap (born 1965), Dutch illustrator and writer
Christopher Schaap (born 1991), American filmmaker 
Dick Schaap (1934–2001), American sportswriter, broadcaster and author
Fritz Schaap (born 1981), German Journalist, war reporter
Jan Schaap (born 1893), early Dutch scoutmaster
Jeremy Schaap (born 1969), American sportswriter, television reporter
Michael Schaap (1874–1957), New York assemblyman, and president of Bloomingdale's
Paul Schaap (born 1950), Dutch whistleblower and journalist
Peter Schaap (born 1946), Dutch singer and writer
Phil Schaap (1951–2021), American jazz radio personality
Ruud Schaap (born 1946), Dutch singer and guitarist

See also
Schaps, surname

Dutch-language surnames